Walter Hodges may refer to:

 C. Walter Hodges (1909–2004), English illustrator and author
 Walter Hodges (academic) (died 1757), English academic administrator at the University of Oxford